The Cosmos Bison, also called the Cosmos Bidulm, is a French two-seat, ultralight trike that is produced by Cosmos ULM. The aircraft is only supplied as a completed aircraft and is not available as a kit.

Design and development
The Bison was designed to comply with the European Fédération Aéronautique Internationale microlight classification. It features a cable-braced hang glider-style high-wing, weight-shift controls, a two-seats-in-tandem open cockpit, tricycle landing gear and a single engine in pusher configuration.

The aircraft wing is made from bolted-together aluminum tubing and covered in Dacron sailcloth. A number of different wings are available for the Bison. The wing is supported by a single tube-type kingpost and uses an "A" frame control bar. Optional equipment includes a cockpit fairing and wheel pants. Engines used are the  Rotax 503 and  Rotax 447 twin cylinder, two-stroke powerplants. The landing gear is cable-braced, which allows a folding design for ground transport or storage.

The Bison was later developed into the Cosmos Phase II, by adding larger seats, new landing gear shock absorbers and a redesigned engine mount to reduce vibration. In 2012 the Bison remained in production alongside the Phase II and Phase III, offering a simpler, lighter and less expensive two seater than the newer models.

Specifications (Bison)

References

External links

Photo of a Cosmos Bison

1990s French ultralight aircraft
Single-engined pusher aircraft
Ultralight trikes